Marcin Baran (born 1963 in Kraków) is a Polish poet and journalist. He has a degree in Polonistics from the Jagiellonian University. He is one of the Polish poets who published their verses in the magazine bruLion (sometimes spelled brulion).

One of the main themes of his poetry is woman, for him the symbol of deathlessness. His poems have been translated into German, Slovak and Czech.

Books of poetry 

 : Oficyna Literacka, 1990
  Kraków-Warszawa: bruLion, 1992
  Kraków: Baran i Suszczyński, 1996 (nominated for Nike Award)
  Poznań: a5, 1996
  Kraków: Oficyna Literacka, 1998
  Kraków: WL, 1999
  Kraków: Zebra, 2000
  Kraków: Wydawnictwo Zielona Sowa 2001 (selected poems)
  Kraków: a5, 2003

References 

 (White Abysses), Host, Brno, 1997, p. 126, 181–9.

Bibliography 
 Polish bibliography

Polish poets
Living people
1963 births
Jagiellonian University alumni